Ponds Forge International Sports Centre is a leisure complex in Sheffield, England, that contains an Olympic-sized swimming pool with seating for 2,600 spectators, family and children's pools (50 m Competition pool and 25 m diving pit), water slides and other sports facilities.

History
Ponds Forge was opened in 1991 as a venue for the Summer Universiade, which the city hosted that year. In the 1994 UK Sports Design Awards Ponds Forge was highly commended in the overall category, and for the use of steel in its construction it won the British Steel Award. The River Sheaf runs under the site and flooded the car park on 21 December 1991, shutting the complex for 6 days. Proof of this can be found on platform Five of Sheffield railway station, because the Sheaf also runs under that, and it also flooded at the same time. A piece of debris from "The Flood" is displayed there and the plaque mounted on it has the same date. In the 2000s Ponds Forge was a venue (along with the nearby Don Valley Stadium) for Channel Four's 'The Games', in which celebrities competed against each other in a wide range of events.

Olympic-sized swimming pool

The 50 metre pool at Ponds Forge is one of ten in the United Kingdom built to current FINA standards, and hence is home to many sporting events. The main pool hall is 90 m long by 60 m wide and when the arches for the roof were constructed temporary supports for them were necessary. When these were removed it "settled" 150 mm. It has two movable bulkheads (so the main tank can be split into 2 or 3 individual pools) and the floors at the end quarters can be raised or lowered from surface level down to 2 m depth. In its long course mode with the bulkheads at the extreme ends it has 10 lanes. If used "width ways" up to twenty 25 m lanes are available. A sophisticated ozone water treatment system is employed that results in lower levels of irritants and reduced toxicity compared with traditional methods of treatment. A number of world records have been set in the pool although only one was long course. The latter was in the heats of the European Championships on 3 August 1993 when Károly Güttler of Hungary went 1.00.95 to set a new world mark in the 100 m breaststroke. As well as competition-level swimming, the pool is also used for lessons, diving, kayaking and scuba diving. It is also open to the general public for lane swimming.

Events hosted
The swimming pool hosted the 1993 Men's European Water Polo Championship (part of the 1993 European Aquatics Championships). It has also hosted the 2006 Underwater Hockey World Championships, in addition to the junior world championships in 2019. The pool is currently used to host the British Octopush Association's annual Nautilus Competition.

Diving pool
Ponds Forge plays host to Europe's deepest diving pool at 5.85 metres. This pool hosted the FINA World Diving Series Championships in April 2011 and was home to USA Diving Squad for the London 2012 Olympic and Paralympic Games. It is also home to the City of Sheffield Water Polo Club, a first division water polo team.

Surf City leisure pool
The "Surf City" leisure pool complex comprises many water-based attractions open for public use:
A modern leisure pool, which is used for lane swimming or leisure swimming.  At regular intervals a wave machine is activated in this pool.
A lazy river goes around the outside of the square pool with a reasonably strong current; children can float on rings in this river.
A smaller children's pool with a waterfall and fountains

Gym
In 2009 the gym at Ponds Forge had a £3 million refurbishment. It now houses a 130-piece gym, a spin studio, numerous group fitness class studios, a steam room and sauna.

Basketball
Within the complex is the International Sports Hall, which can be used as a basketball venue.  The maximum seating capacity of the arena is 1,000; until 2006 it was the home venue for the Sheffield Sharks, before they relocated to the EIS Sheffield. Sheffield Sharks returned to Ponds Forge in 2019 as their home venue. Amongst other events it has also hosted several Great Britain international matches as well as the Semi-finals of the BBL Cup in 2004 and the BBL Trophy in February 2008.

Location
Ponds Forge is at the south-western side of the traffic roundabout at Park Square, close to Sheffield City Centre.  It is within five minutes' walking distance of the bus and rail interchange at Sheffield railway station and is also served by the tram stop at Fitzalan Square/Ponds Forge.  The Sheffield Parkway dual-carriageway runs directly from Park Square to junction 33 of the M1 motorway.

See also
Sheffield Arena
Don Valley Stadium
Sheffield City Trust
List of Olympic-size swimming pools in the United Kingdom

References

External links

Official Website

Sports venues in Sheffield
Sheffield Sharks
Sports venues completed in 1991